Carthage is a city and the county seat of Hancock County, Illinois, United States. The population was 2,490 as of the 2020 census, Carthage is best known for being the site of the 1844 death of Joseph Smith, founder of the Latter Day Saint movement.

History
The first European-Americans settlers arrived in Carthage and Hancock County in the first few decades of the 19th century. By 1833, they had erected simple buildings in Carthage, and the town was platted in 1838. By this time Carthage had been designated as the county seat of Hancock County.

The only person legally hanged in Hancock County, Efram Fraim, was defended in his trial by roaming country attorney Abraham Lincoln. Fraim was found guilty of murder. Lincoln filed an appeal with the judge in the trial, which was as far as appeals in those days mostly went. Because at the time Carthage had no jail, Fraim was kept at the Courthouse, which was next to the school. Fraim would converse with the children from his second-floor window. As a result of these conversations, most of the school children were present when their new friend, Efram, was hanged. The hanging is believed to have taken place near the current city sewer plant east of town, where a natural amphitheater allowed for a crowd to view the spectacle.

While incarcerated in the Carthage Jail in June 1844, Joseph Smith, founder of the Latter Day Saint movement, and his brother Hyrum Smith were killed by a mob on Thursday, June 27, 1844.

On October 22, 1858, Abraham Lincoln spoke in Carthage while campaigning for the Senate. A large stone on the south side of the Courthouse square commemorates the spot.

Over the years the jail had been modified and used for different purposes. For a period the jail was home to Carthage College. The jail has been restored to a close approximation of its appearance in 1844 and is now owned by the Church of Jesus Christ of Latter-day Saints. The site, a full city block, is a historical visitor's center.

Regionally noted botanist, philanthropist, and traveler Dr. Alice L. Kibbe called Carthage home. Along with Dr. Kibbe's personal collections, Carthage's Kibbe Hancock Heritage Museum houses a variety of exhibits celebrating local and regional history.

Carthage is the only city in Illinois to have all of the jails ever used still in existence: The old jail, called the Mormon Jail; the jail next built which was also the Sheriff's residence and is on the south side of the Courthouse square; and the new jail, on Highway 136 on the city's west side.

The Hancock County Courthouse in Carthage, built in 1908, is the third courthouse for the county.  It is at the center of the square in Carthage. The courthouse and shops surrounding the square have been listed on the National Register of Historic Places since 1986.

Geography
Carthage is located near the center of Hancock County at  (40.414327, -91.133472). U.S. Route 136 runs through the center of town as Buchanan Street; it leads east  to Macomb and west  to Keokuk, Iowa, on the Mississippi River. Illinois Route 94 leads north from Carthage as Madison Street and east with US-136 to Illinois Route 110 just outside the city limits.

In June 2006, development property on the east side of Carthage was voluntarily annexed into the city limits.

Demographics

2010 census
As of the 2010 Census, there were 2,605 persons living in 1,151 households in Carthage. With an area of 2.44 square miles, the population density was 1,067 persons per square mile. There were 1,308 total housing units, with an average density of 536 per square mile. Racially, 97.3% of Carthage residents identified themselves as white, 0.3% identified as Black/African American, 0.3% were Native American, and 0.4% identified themselves as Asian. No residents identified themselves as Pacific Islander. 0.5% of the remaining population identified themselves as belonging to some other race, while 1.2% belonged to multiple races. Between all races, 2.0% of the population identified as hispanic or Latino.

2007–2011 Census data showed 19.2% of Carthage residents were under the age of 18, while 22.6% of the population was over the age of 65. The median age in Carthage was 44.0 years, and there were 88.3 males for every 100 females. Of residents over the age of 15, 50.8% of persons were married. Of persons over the age of 25, 93.2% had earned at least a high school diploma while 19.2% had earned a bachelor's degree or higher. 7.2% of persons held a graduate degree.

For census data collected between 2007 and 2011, Carthage's median (middle) household income was $46,607, with a mean (average) household income of $51,584. The median per-capita income was $22,729. Unemployment was measured to be 7.9%, while 10.7% of persons and 8.8% of families lived with earnings below the federal poverty line.

2000 census
At the 2000 census there were 2,725 people in 1,184 households, including 709 families, in the city. The city's racial makeup was 98.13% White, 0.48% African American, 0.48% Native American, 0.55% Asian, 0.07% Pacific Islander, 0.04% from other races, and 0.26% from two or more races. Hispanic or Latino of any race were 0.33%.

There were 1,184 households, of which 27.8% had children under the age of 18 living with them, 47.0% were married couples living together, 10.0% had a female householder with no husband present, and 40.1% were non-families. 35.6% of households were one person, and 17.9% were one person aged 65 or older. The average household size was 2.22 and the average family size was 2.87.

In the city the population was spread out, with 23.6% under the age of 18, 7.3% from 18 to 24, 25.4% from 25 to 44, 21.8% from 45 to 64, and 21.9% 65 or older. The median age was 40 years. For every 100 females, there were 85.0 males. For every 100 females age 18 and over, there were 79.2 males.

The city's median household income was $34,677, and the median family income was $50,142. Males had a median income of $36,058 versus $19,972 for females. The city's per capita income was $18,269. About 3.6% of families and 8.4% of the population were below the poverty line, including 7.3% of those under age 18 and 7.7% of those age 65 or over.

Economy

Carthage's economy centers uponagriculture and supporting industries. The surrounding land is devoted to the cultivation of crops, especially corn and soybeans. Industrial hog farms are also near the city.

The company Methode Electronics, Inc. operates an auto parts production facility in Carthage, though the company no longer employs as large a portion of the population as was once the case.

Education
Beginning in August 2007, the Carthage High School (also known as Hancock County Central High School) building became the home of the newly formed Illini West High School, consolidating the high school districts of Carthage, La Harpe, and Dallas City. The three cities maintain separate facilities for elementary and middle schools.

Carl Sandburg College, a two-year community college in Galesburg, has a satellite campus on the north side of Carthage.

From 1870 to 1964, Carthage was home to Carthage College, which relocated to Kenosha, Wisconsin. From 1965 to 1989, Carthage was home to Robert Morris University–Illinois, which merged with Moser School of Business and relocated to Chicago.

The former Carthage College campus was purchased by Prairieland Investment Group in June 2007. (Hancock County Journal Pilot June 27, 2007) Some buildings are renovated for use by Carthage Veterinary Clinic. The auditorium was given to Carl Sandburg College, and has been restored for use by the college and for community presentations and events.

Culture and arts
The Legacy Theatre, which was renovated in 2010 and now seats 525 people, hosts many theatrical and musical events each year.

Healthcare 
Memorial Hospital in Carthage opened its doors in 1949, named for the local heroes who brought victory in World War II. Six decades later, Carthage celebrated the grand opening of a new facility in July 2009. The new Memorial Hospital includes 21st Century technology. The hospital operates clinics in the county including Midwest Family Medical Care, Women & Family Medical Group and Convenient Care After-Hours Clinic in Carthage; Memorial Medical Augusta Clinic; Bowen Family Practice; Memorial Medical Nauvoo Clinic; and Memorial Medical Clinic in LaHarpe. Additionally, Hancock County Emergency Medical Services is headquartered in Carthage.

Notable people
 Orville F. Berry, Illinois state senator, lawyer, and businessman
 Virginia Cherrill, co-star of Charlie Chaplin in City Lights
 George Clark, college and pro football coach
 Mary Davidson, Illinois state representative and newspaper editor
 Beatrice Gray, actress
 John Nelson Hyde, Presbyterian Missionary in India (Punjab)
 John Mahoney, actor, is buried there
 Leroy A. Ufkes, Illinois state representative and lawyer
 Rip Williams, Major League Baseball player from 1911–18

See also

 List of municipalities in Illinois

References

External links

  Carthage Chamber of Commerce

Cities in Illinois
Cities in Hancock County, Illinois
County seats in Illinois
Populated places established in the 1830s
Significant places in Mormonism